() is a Dutch televised music competition for children, held annually since 2003. The winner of the contest goes on to represent the Netherlands in the Junior Eurovision Song Contest, an international version of the competition.

History 
The first edition was organised in 2003 by Dutch broadcaster AVRO (which later became AVROTROS). Kids of age 8 through 15 could submit their own original songs, of which nine songs advanced to the televised final. From 2004 until 2015, the candidates also sang a common song that did not compete, and (with the exception of 2006) the show also consisted of two televised semi-finals.

In 2016, there was no televised show; the entrant for that year's Junior Eurovision Song Contest was selected internally. Also, since that year the auditors no longer need to submit original songs. The show returned in 2017 with semi-finals, but the finalists sang covers instead of original songs. Since 2018, there are no semi-finals and original songs are written for the finalists.

Past editions

Winners

Jury members 
The winner is determined by three sets of points; one given by a professional jury, one by a kid's jury, and one by public voting. The following table lists the members of the professional jury in the final.

See also 
 Netherlands in the Junior Eurovision Song Contest
 Melodi Grand Prix Junior
 MGP Junior (Danish TV series)
 Lilla Melodifestivalen

References

External links

Junior Eurovision Song Contest
Nationaal Songfestival
Singing competitions
Singing talent shows
2003 Dutch television series debuts
2000s Dutch television series
2010s Dutch television series
2020s Dutch television series
Dutch children's television series
Dutch-language television shows
Dutch music television series
Recurring events established in 2003
Television series about children
Television series about teenagers